Stanley Michael "Stan" Molan (26 September 1893 – 27 June 1943) was an Australian rules footballer who played with Fitzroy in the Victorian Football League (VFL).

Molan was already 24 when he started his career at Fitzroy. He was handy in front of goals in his first two seasons, with his 24 goals in 1918 bettered by only one teammate, Jimmy Freake. He kicked another 22 goals in 1919 but from then spent most of his time as a defender.

Playing in a successful era meant that Molan was able to make 10 appearances in finals football. He was Fitzroy's centre half-back in their 1922 premiership team and played in the same position when they lost the grand final a year later.

He was a four time VFL representative.

References

1893 births
1943 deaths
Players of Australian handball
Australian rules footballers from Victoria (Australia)
Australian Rules footballers: place kick exponents
Fitzroy Football Club players
Fitzroy Football Club Premiership players
One-time VFL/AFL Premiership players